Sir Edward John Russell  (31 October 1872 – 12 July 1965) was a British soil chemist, agriculture scientist, and director of Rothamsted Experimental Station from 1912 to 1943. He was responsible for hiring R A Fisher for statistical research at Rothamsted and driven by concerns over a lack of international information exchange about agriculture, he initiated the Imperial Agricultural Bureaux, which later became the Commonwealth Agricultural Bureaux.

Russell was born at Frampton-on-Severn, Gloucestershire, the eldest son of the Reverend Edward T Russell who had worked earlier as a schoolmaster. In 1885 he studied at Birmingham where the family moved before relocating the next year to London. He was educated at Carmarthen Presbyterian College; University College of Wales, Aberystwyth; the Victoria University of Manchester, and in 1902 earned his Doctor of Science in chemistry from the University of London.

Russell worked as a demonstrator and lecturer at the chemistry department in Victoria University, Manchester from 1898 and became head of chemistry at the South Eastern Agricultural College from 1892 to 1907. From 1907 to 1912 he was a soil chemist at Rothamsted supported by a Goldsmith's Company's endowment of £10,000. In 1913 he became director of the research station, succeeding Alfred Daniel Hall.  Russell worked on soil chemistry and plant nutrition appointing R A Fisher in 1919. In the 1918 New Year Honours Russell was  awarded an OBE for his wartime work as Technical Adviser in the Government's Food Production Department. He was knighted in 1922. Russell was President of the Geographical Association in 1923 and President of the Aberystwyth Old Students' Association from  1928 to 1929.

Russell was president of the British Association for 1948–1949. He married Elnor Oldham of Manchester in 1903 and they had six children of whom one son, Walter, became a soil-physicist at Rothamsted. He is buried, with his wife, in the churchyard of St Nicholas in Harpenden.

Books

References

1872 births
1965 deaths
Fellows of the Royal Society
Presidents of the British Science Association
New Naturalist writers
Aberystwyth Old Students' Association
Officers of the Order of the British Empire
Knights Bachelor
Victoria Medal recipients
Alumni of the Victoria University of Manchester
Alumni of Aberystwyth University
Alumni of the University of London
Academics of Wye College